Frija Zoaretz (7 December 1907 – 30 April 1993) was an Israeli politician who served as a member of the Knesset for the National Religious Party between 1955 and 1969.

Biography
Born in Libya, Zoaretz worked as a teacher, and was a Zionist activist. He made aliyah to Israel in 1949, and became chairman of the Libyan Community Committee. He also joined the National Religious Party, and was elected to the Knesset on its list in 1955. He was re-elected in 1959 and 1961. Although he lost his seat in the November 1965 elections, he returned to the Knesset as a replacement for Shabtai Daniel on 1 December the same year. He lost his seat for a second and final time in the 1969 elections.

He died in 1993 at the age of 85.

References

External links

1907 births
1993 deaths
Israeli educators
Libyan educators
Libyan emigrants to Israel
20th-century Israeli Jews
Libyan Jews
People from Tripoli, Libya
National Religious Party politicians
Israeli people of Libyan-Jewish descent
Members of the 3rd Knesset (1955–1959)
Members of the 4th Knesset (1959–1961)
Members of the 5th Knesset (1961–1965)
Members of the 6th Knesset (1965–1969)